Little Lost Lake is an alpine lake in Blaine County, Idaho, United States, located in the Smoky Mountains in Sawtooth National Forest. While no trails lead to the lake, it is most easily accessed from the end of forest road 170. The lake is located just east of Prairie Creek Peak. It is also near Smoky Lake, Big Lost Lake, and Upper and Lower Norton lakes.

See also

 List of lakes in Idaho

References

External links
Little Lost Lake Idaho Department of Fish and Game

Lakes of Idaho
Lakes of Blaine County, Idaho
Glacial lakes of the United States
Glacial lakes of the Sawtooth National Forest